KJUD, virtual channel 8 (VHF digital channel 11), is an ABC/CW+/Fox-affiliated television station licensed to Juneau, Alaska, United States. The station is owned by Vision Alaska LLC. KJUD's transmitter is located along Douglas Highway in West Juneau. Master control and some internal operations are based at the facilities of fellow ABC affiliate and Your Alaska Link flagship KYUR in Anchorage.

History
KINY-TV, Juneau's first television station, signed on the air on February 19, 1956, becoming KJUD in 1983. For many years, it was Juneau's only commercial station, and is still the only full-power commercial station in the area.

Initially, KJUD carried programming from ABC, NBC, and CBS for many years. During the late 1950s, the station was also briefly affiliated with the NTA Film Network.

In 1995, the station became a part of the Alaska Superstation network, with KIMO (now KYUR) and KATN. In September 2006, KJUD began to show programming from The CW on its digital subchannel. The subchannel was initially known as Juneau CW, but has since been rebranded to Alaska CW. Smith Media sold KJUD and the remainder of the "ABC Alaska's Superstation" system to Vision Alaska LLC in 2010. On September 1, 2011, KJUD began carrying programming from the Fox network on digital subchannel 8.3; the subchannel became the first Fox affiliate in the Juneau market. At some unknown point, The CW and Fox swapped subchannels, with Fox moving to digital subchannel 8.2 and The CW moving to digital subchannel 8.3.

Digital channels
The station's digital signal is multiplexed:

References

External links
 
 

1956 establishments in Alaska
ABC network affiliates
Television channels and stations established in 1956
JUD